The Elster-Saale Canal, renamed in 1999 by the Federal Waterways and Shipping Administration to Saale-Leipzig Canal or SLK and on the Halle side also called Saale-Elster Canal, was a canal project started in 1933 and aborted in 1943. It was intended to link the White Elster river with the Saale near Leuna and thus enable the city of Leipzig to be joined to Germany's inland waterway network. The 11 kilometre long water-filled channel is one of the "special federal waterways".

A lock was built near Wusteneutzch which would have allowed canal freight traffic to connect with the Saale; however the canal never reached this point. This link would have given Leipzig access to the Elbe via the Saale and thus to Hamburg and the North Sea. The canal was planned for ships up to 1,000 tonnes in weight (roughly Class IV).

Plans to complete the canal have been revived and an Elster-Saale Canal Society has been formed.

Gallery

See also
List of waterbodies in Saxony-Anhalt

Literature
Wolfram Sturm, Leipzig und seine Schiffskanäle. Leipzig, 1998.

References

External links

Photos and information on the Elster-Saale Canal and Karl-Heine Canal at www.ostwall.com
Photos and information on the Elster-Saale Canal and Karl-Heine Canal at www.verkehrsrelikte.de
Saale-Leipzig Canal in the electronic waterway information system (ELWIS)
Photos of its construction
Official homepage of the Saale-Elster Canal Society (English version)
The Touristic Water Network Leipziger Neuseenland

Canals in Germany
CElstersaalecanal
CElstersaalecanal
Geography of Leipzig
Former or disused inland waterways